The Uhuru Movement (Pronounced  is the Swahili word for "freedom") is an American-based socialist and African internationalist movement founded in 1972 and led by the African People's Socialist Party (APSP), whose chairman is Omali Yeshitela. It is centered on the theory of African internationalism, which it says provides a historical materialist explanation for the social and economic conditions of African people worldwide.

Political views and history 
The Uhuru Movement's political theory is African internationalism, which states that capitalism was born parasitic through the attack on Africa and its people. African Internationalism holds that capitalism is imperialism developed to its highest stage, not the other way around, as theorized by Vladimir Lenin.

This belief derives from Karl Marx's 1867 book Capital, in which Marx wrote of the condition essential to the emergence of capitalism which he called the "primitive accumulation" of capital. African Internationalism is not a static theory that only refers to past conditions, it refers also to the conditions that African people are faced with today. It refers to African people who live inside what it views as imperialist centers, such as the United States and Europe, as an "internal (or domestic) colony". The Movement has called for the release of all African prisoners in U.S. prisons, described as "concentration camps", and has described U.S. police forces as an "illegitimate standing army". They have called for the withdrawal of police forces from exploited and oppressed African American communities.

In the 1990s, tensions between the police in St. Petersburg, Florida, and the Uhuru Movement were high. Members of the Uhuru Movement frequently protested against the police's treatment of African Americans, usually after the murders of African Americans by police. On October 25, 1996, violence erupted after a white police officer shot and killed a young black man driving a stolen car. Cars and buildings were torched, protestors shouted, and rocks, along with other items, were tossed at the police officers at the scene of the shooting. At least 20 protestors were arrested. The next day, a large group of Uhuru members went back to the scene and called for the release of the arrested protestors. Sobukwe Bambaata, one of the Uhuru members, stated that the rioting would have never occurred "if the police did not come into our community and treat us like dogs".

Although violence broke out in 1996, most of the protests organized by the movement remained peaceful.

Organizations and media
 International People's Democratic Uhuru Movement (InPDUM) works to fight the struggle for "Bread, Peace and Black Power". Located on three continents around the world, INPDUM seeks reparations, state power and self-government for African people worldwide. 
 The Burning Spear Newspaper is the Uhuru Movement's newspaper. They call it "the voice of the international African Revolution".

Controversy and criticism
In 2004, Uhuru Movement's leader Omali Yeshitela tore down a Halloween display in St. Petersburg, Florida, which depicted "a stuffed figure hung by the neck on a homemade gallows". Subsequent opinions and letters to the St. Petersburg Times regarding the incident were critical of both the Uhuru Movement and Yeshitela's conduct.

The Uhuru Movement came to national attention during the 2008 Presidential campaign season when they interrupted Barack Obama at a town hall meeting in St. Petersburg and asked the candidate "What about the black community?", alleging that he was not speaking out for Africans on issues such as police brutality, high unemployment, predatory lending, and Hurricane Katrina.

The group was criticized by the Anti-Defamation League for engaging in demonstrations on January 3, 2009, in St. Petersburg which the ADL claims encouraged anti-Israel and anti-Zionist rallies.

In 2009, the International People's Democratic Uhuru Movement organized a march in support of Lovelle Mixon and against the Oakland Police Department. Mixon, an Oakland, California, resident, had been accused of killing four Oakland police officers and died during a shootout after a traffic stop, coincidentally just blocks away from the local Uhuru headquarters. 
 
At the Johannes Gutenberg University in Mainz, Germany, the General Students' Committee (AStA) broke apart in April 2015 as a consequence of internal dispute over purported antisemitism after having organized an information event about the Uhuru Movement on JGU campus in January. The AStA distanced itself both from the Uhuru Movement, African People's Socialist Party and its leader Omali Yeshitela stating that "the struggle against racism and the consequences of colonialism should not blind us to other reactionary ideologies" and regretted providing a platform for this movement.

The Uhuru Movement has been accused by state prosecutors of collaborating with alleged Russian foreign agent Aleksandr Viktorovich Ionov to sow social divisions in the United States. Members of the group have traveled to Saint Petersburg, Russia, to attend an anti-globalization conference, and the group has also acknowledged that it supports Russia in its ongoing war with Ukraine. On July 29, 2022, the Uhuru House in St. Petersburg, Florida, was raided by the FBI due to an indictment by a grand jury alleging a conspiracy between Ionov and the Uhuru movement to spread Russian disinformation under the guise of domestic political movements. An FBI Tampa Special agent said that "The facts and circumstances surrounding this indictment are some of the most egregious and blatant violations we've seen by the Russian government in order to destabilize and undermine trust in American Democracy." On December 23, 2022, the Uhuru Movement organized an emergency meeting via Zoom, stating that the APSP expected new indictments by the FBI and the Department of Justice "in early January 2023 and possibly sooner", for violating the Foreign Agents Registration Act.

See also
 African nationalism
 African socialism
 Black Power
 Dead Prez
 Ujamaa

External links 
 International People's Democratic Uhuru Movement
 Uhuru Movement	
 African People's Socialist Party
 African Socialist International

References 

African and Black nationalism in the United States
African socialism
Pan-Africanism
Political terminology in South Africa
Russia–United States relations